Backing Australia's Ability (BAA) was a five-year innovation plan launched by the Howard Government in January 2001.

Previous policy 
Previous policies for this group of portfolios under the Howard Government were:
 Investing for Growth, December 1997  increased support for business innovation by providing $1.26 billion over the four years from 1998–99, including additional funding for R&D grants, venture capital and technology diffusion.
 Knowledge and Innovation, December 1999  announced a new policy and funding framework for higher education research and research training.

Science and Innovation Committee 
The Science and Innovation Committee (SIC), originally known as the Ministerial Committee to Oversight Implementation of Backing Australia's Ability (MCOIBAA), is a sub-committee of Cabinet established as part of the initiative to oversee the implementation of Backing Australia's Ability. It is composed of:
 Prime Minister of Australia, chairman
 Minister for Industry, Tourism and Resources, Ian Macfarlane
 Minister for Communications, Information Technology and the Arts, Richard Alston followed by Helen Coonan since July 2004
 Minister for Education, Science and Training, Brendan Nelson followed by Julie Bishop since January 2006
 Minister for Finance and Administration, Nick Minchin

An Innovation Action Plan for the Future 
The initiative set aside AUD 2.9 billion over five years 2001–02 to 2005–06, overseen by a Science and Innovation Ministerial Council, chaired by the Prime Minister and advised by the Chief Scientist.

The objectives were:
 an additional $736 million for Australian Research Council competitive grants, doubling funding by 2005–06
 an additional $583 million for research infrastructure
 an additional $176 million for world class centres of excellence in information and communications technology and biotechnology
 providing $155 million to support investments in major national research facilities
 $535 million over five years for the R&D Start Program
 reforming the R&D tax concession
 a premium rate of 175 per cent for additional R&D activity
 a tax rebate for small companies
 an additional $227 million for the Cooperative Research Centres Program, and encouraging greater access by small and medium enterprises
 an additional $151 million to universities, to create 2000 additional university places each year, with priority given to ICT, mathematics and science – to be backed by adjustments to existing immigration arrangements to attract more migrants with ICT skills
 $130 million to foster scientific, mathematical and technological skills and innovation in government schools in those States where the Enrolment Benchmark Adjustment (EBA) is triggered.
 $246 million for a new Systemic Infrastructure Initiative, to upgrade the basic infrastructure of universities, such as scientific and research equipment, libraries and laboratory facilities

Building our future through science and innovation 
On 4 May 2004 the Prime Minister announced a second plan, subtitled "Building our future through science and innovation", which is referred to as "BAA2".

The objectives were:
 $1 billion for a new Commercial Ready programme
 $542 million for a new National Collaborative Research Infrastructure Strategy
 an additional $305 million for CSIRO National Research Flagships
 an additional $200 million for National Health and Medical Research Council to assist independent medical research institutions
 an additional $100 million or the Commercialising Emerging Technologies (COMET) programme
 $38.8 million for a new Maths, Science and Innovation Teaching initiative that will involve research bodies and undergraduates in primary and secondary school classes
 $7.2 million to co-ordinate and focus research in support of Australia's counter-terrorism needs

See also
 Australian Competitive Grants Register
 Measuring Australia's Progress

References

External links 
 Backing Australia's Ability website 
 Archive on Pandora Archive
 Backing Australia's Ability Policy Launch
 Backing Australia's Future

Education in Australia
Science and technology in Australia